Harun bin Durabi (born 11 January 1963) is a Malaysian politician who has served as the State Assistant Minister of Science, Techonology and Innovation of Sabah since January 2023 and Member of the Sabah State Legislative Assembly (MLA) for Bengkoka since September 2020. He served as State Assistant Minister of Rural Development of Sabah from October 2020 to January 2023. He is a member of the United Malays National Organisation (UMNO), a component party of the Barisan Nasional (BN) coalition.

Election results

Honours
  :
  Member of the Order of the Defender of the Realm (AMN) (2012)
  :
  Commander of the Order of Kinabalu (PGDK) – Datuk (2022)

References

Malaysian Muslims
Members of the Sabah State Legislative Assembly
Kadazan-Dusun people
United Malays National Organisation politicians
Living people
1963 births
Members of the Order of the Defender of the Realm
Commanders of the Order of Kinabalu